Military patrol was featured in the Winter Olympic Games programme in 1924 to 1948.

See also
 Military patrol
 Biathlon at the Winter Olympics

References

 
Discontinued sports at the Winter Olympics
Military patrol (sport) competitions